The Kenilworth Trail is a paved bicycle trail in Minneapolis, Minnesota, United States. Like the Cedar Lake Trail, most of the route is composed of a triple-divided cycleway/pedway with a pair of one-way paths for bicycles and another path for pedestrians. On some maps, a southern segment of the Kenilworth Trail is called the Burnham Trail. The trail corridor has been considered the most highly trafficked in the Minneapolis park system.

Access 
At its northern end, it is easy for westbound Cedar Lake Trail users to accidentally get on the Kenilworth Trail, since continuing on the Cedar Lake trail requires taking a right turn at a "T" intersection just south of Interstate 394. Cyclists who miss the turn find themselves on the Kenilworth instead.

Route
The trail starts at the Midtown Greenway, and continues northeast. It crosses Cedar Lake Parkway, and the Cedar Lake Channel. It crosses under Burnham Road, and crosses at-grade 21st Street. It intersects several nature trails and terminates at the Cedar Lake Trail.

History 
The trail runs adjacent to a freight railway line that was originally part of the Minneapolis and St. Louis Railway, but is now owned by the Hennepin County Regional Railroad Authority. The Twin Cities and Western Railroad currently operates freight trains on the rail line.

Management 
According to the Minneapolis Bicyclist & Pedestrian Count Report from 2013, approximately 2,100 bicyclists and 410 pedestrians are estimated to use the trail daily. As of 2019, annual visits to Kenilworth Trail totaled 746,000, making the corridor "the most intensely used trail in Minneapolis’ park system given its compact size. In May 2019, the City of Minneapolis closed a portion of the Kenilworth Trail due to construction of the Southwest Light Rail Transit line. The full trail is scheduled to reopen the summer of 2022.  Work on the light rail line stopped in January 2022 after damage was detected at a condo unit near the line, but was cleared to resume in April of that year.

See also 
List of shared-use paths in Minneapolis

References

External links
 Kenilworth Trail map

Bike paths in Minnesota
Parks in Minneapolis
Rail trails in Minnesota
Shared-use paths in Minneapolis